Blood, Sweat & Tears is the second album by the band Blood, Sweat & Tears, released on December 11, 1968. It was commercially successful, rising to the top of the U.S. charts for a collective seven weeks and yielding three successive Top 5 singles. It received a Grammy Award for Album of the Year in 1970 and has been certified quadruple platinum by the RIAA with sales of more than four million units in the U.S. In Canada; it enjoyed four runs and altogether eight weeks at No. 1 on the RPM national album chart.

History
Al Kooper, Randy Brecker and Jerry Weiss had left BS&T after the first album. Bobby Colomby and Steve Katz searched for a replacement singer and selected David Clayton-Thomas. Three more musicians joined to bring the band to nine members. Columbia assigned James William Guercio (who was simultaneously working with new band Chicago) to produce a new album.

"More and More", "Smiling Phases", and "You've Made Me So Very Happy" were among the songs that Kooper had helped to arrange before leaving the group. The song selection was much more pop oriented than the first album, with more compositions from outside the band. It was recorded at the then state-of-the-art CBS Studios in New York City.  The studio had just taken delivery of one of the first of the model MM-1000 16-track tape recorders, built by Ampex.  The new technology allowed for far more flexibility in overdubbing and mixing than the four- and eight-track tape recorders which were standard in 1968. The album was among the first 16-track recordings released to the public.

An additional song, "Children of the Wind", was recorded for the album but was not included.  It later appeared on the compilation The Very Best of Blood, Sweat and Tears: What Goes Up!

Reception

In his Allmusic retrospective review, music critic William Ruhlmann called the players a "less adventurous unit" than on the debut album, but called the album "more accessible... It was a repertoire to build a career on, and Blood, Sweat & Tears did exactly that, although they never came close to equaling this album." In his lengthy contemporary review, Jon Landau of Rolling Stone dismissed the album, writing; "The listener responds to the illusion that he is hearing something new when in fact he is hearing mediocre rock, OK jazz, etc., thrown together in a contrived and purposeless way."

The album was voted number 660 in the third edition of Colin Larkin's All Time Top 1000 Albums (2000). It was selected for the 2006 book 1001 Albums You Must Hear Before You Die.

Track listing

2000 CD bonus tracks

Personnel
David Clayton-Thomas – lead vocals except as noted
Steve Katz – guitar, harmonica, vocals, lead vocals on "Sometimes in Winter"
Jim Fielder – bass
Dick Halligan – organ, piano, flute, trombone, vocals
Fred Lipsius – alto saxophone, piano
Lew Soloff – trumpet, flugelhorn
Chuck Winfield – trumpet, flugelhorn
Alan Rubin - trumpet on "Spinning Wheel" 
Jerry Hyman – trombone, recorder
Bobby Colomby – drums, percussion, vocals

Production
Producer: James William Guercio
Engineers: Fred Catero, Roy Halee
Arrangers: Dick Halligan, Fred Lipsius, Al Kooper
Cover art: Timothy Quay, Bob Cato
Photography: Harrie George
Design: John Berg

Charts
Album – UK Albums Chart (United Kingdom)

References

Blood, Sweat & Tears albums
1968 albums
Albums produced by James William Guercio
Columbia Records albums
Grammy Award for Album of the Year
Grammy Hall of Fame Award recipients
Media containing Gymnopedies